Ziff  is an unknown material or item, probably a metal, mentioned in the Book of Mormon (Mosiah 11:3,8).  The text mentions ziff twice, first in a list of possessions taxed by King Noah, then in a list of "precious things" (the rest of which were all metals) used to ornament various buildings.

In Hebrew, the word zîw means "splendor" or  "brightness". A footnote in the 2013 Latter-Day Saint edition of the Book of Mormon suggests translations for possible related Hebrew words as "adjective, 'shining'; verb, 'to overlay or plate with metal.'"  

John L. Sorenson, a Latter-day Saint scholar of Mesoamerican archaeology, has opined that the most likely possibility for ziff is an alloy called tumbaga composed of gold and copper.

In the Arabic language, a ziff is a special kind of curved sword somewhat like a scimitar, which is carried in a sheath and often used for ornamentation, as well as for more practical purposes.

References

Metals
Book of Mormon words and phrases